AfE-Turm ('AfE Tower') was a 38-storey (32 office floors),  skyscraper in the Westend district of Frankfurt, Germany. It was the tallest building in Frankfurt from 1972-1974.

The building was part of the Bockenheim campus of the Johann Wolfgang Goethe University and until 2013 housed the offices and seminar rooms of the departments of Social Sciences and Education. AfE is an acronym for Abteilung für Erziehungswissenschaft (Department of Pedagogy); however, this department never moved in because it was closed before the construction of the tower was finished, which happened in 1972. The tower was demolished on 2 February 2014.

Background

Planning and construction of AfE-Turm began in the early 1960s. The building became necessary in 1961, when the College of Pedagogy was incorporated into the University, and the old Bettinaschule in the Westend turned out to be inadequate, even as a provisional arrangement. The building inherently lacked the required functionality.

The north side of the tower housed the library of the social sciences, as well as seminar rooms with 1.5 times the floor height. The south side consisted of offices only a single floor high, which required an intricate system of staircases and split-levels between the two halves, considerably complicating orientation. After the construction, a cafeteria was established in the top floor, but was closed for lack of popularity. This floor was not accessible with all lifts, and was considered a hard-to-find secret due to the good view in all directions. The student-managed TuCa (Tower Café) on the ground floor was cleared by the police at the behest of the university administration, in order to open a café managed by the Studentenwerk, named the C'AfE. Since the beginning of 2007, the TuCa sat "in exile" on the fifth floor.

The tower was designed for 2,500 students. However, the building was occupied since its opening with a multiple of that. As a result, the seven elevators had waiting periods of up to fifteen minutes.

In August 2005, a university employee was killed in an accident when her lift got stuck between two floors, and she attempted to exit. It is still controversial whether this accident was a result of human error or a series of almost daily failures of the building's technology. Since the tower was to be demolished within the next few years, the university administration had to avoid all non-essential renovation work. At intervals, however, façade repairs had to be carried out.

The tower was a popular destination for student protests, as it could be completely sealed off with relatively few helpers, in contrast to most other buildings of the university. The dramatically worsened study conditions within the tower in recent years were another motive. The resulting tower blockades were an integral part of periodic protests at the Goethe University for many years.

Demolition 
The departments of Social Sciences and Education moved to the University's Westend Campus in Spring 2013. The building had been empty since the end of April 2013. The gradual demolition of the tower commenced in July 2013 and was finalized at the end of January 2014, when authorities gave the green light for its implosion. The implosion occurred on 2 February 2014, at 10:04 CET. It is the tallest building in Europe ever to be demolished by implosion.

See also 
 List of tallest buildings in Frankfurt
 List of tallest buildings in Germany
 List of tallest voluntarily demolished buildings

References

External links

AfE-Turm at A View On Cities

1972 establishments in Germany
2014 disestablishments in Germany
Goethe University Frankfurt
University and college buildings completed in 1972
Skyscrapers in Frankfurt
Buildings and structures demolished in 2014
Former skyscrapers
Demolished buildings and structures in Germany
Articles containing video clips
Buildings and structures demolished by controlled implosion